Ace Lightning is a children's television series co-produced by the BBC and Alliance Atlantis. The series was originally broadcast in the United Kingdom but was also aired in other countries, including the United States, Australia, New Zealand and South Africa. The show was filmed in Canada, but the program was set in the United States. It ran for two seasons and spawned a number of merchandising products. The series premiered on 4 September 2002 and ended on 18 May 2005.

The programme featured live actors interacting with computer animated characters from a fictional video game. The series is significant in that until its creation, live action and CGI had not been attempted to such a huge and constant degree within a weekly television series.

Series overview 
The series follows the life of British teenager Mark Hollander, who moved to the American town Conestoga Hills with his parents. One stormy night, Mark plays his favourite video game, the fictional Ace Lightning and the Carnival of Doom–a superhero-based adventure game where hero Ace Lightning traverses the Carnival of Doom to find the pieces of the magical Amulet of Zoar, whilst battling his nemesis Lord Fear. Mark stumbles across a mysterious seventh level, which is not meant to exist. A lightning bolt strikes the antenna on his roof, and through an electrical surge, the characters of the game come to life. Ace hires Mark as his sidekick to fulfil the game's objectives in the real world. Mark's life is turned upside down, and his duty as a Lightning Knight affects his school grades and social life, often forcing him to make excuses for his family and friends. Meanwhile, Lord Fear's group of villains occupy the town's rundown Kent Bros. Carnival.

Most episodes balanced Mark's social issues and dealing with the game characters, and the animated characters fighting over the collected amulet pieces. The world and rules of the game played out in Conestoga Hill; for example, when two pieces of the Amulet were connected, a new character or weapon would be summoned. Four human characters learned of Mark's double life, including his best friend Chuck Mugel, girlfriend Kat Adams, school teacher Mr. Cheseborough who comes to the belief that the characters are aliens, and Mark's cousin Ashley. Another character who is aware of the goings on is Duff Kent, the owner of the carnival who is shanghaied into being a minion for Lord Fear. An ongoing story was the love triangle between Ace and villain Lady Illusion, who was Lord Fear's mistress throughout the first season but betrays him in the finale.

The first season ended with Mark winning the game, with all the antagonists save Lady Illusion returning to the game world. In the second season, Chuck becomes Ace's secondary sidekick, and all  the villains return under the leadership of a new antagonist named Kilobyte. Kilobyte was created by Rick Hummel, a computer repairman and former games developer who took on the alias of the "Master Programmer". Rick developed the program that brought the game to life, but was ridiculed and fired as a result. He desired to prove his worth by bringing the characters to life and ultimately conquering the world. A blackout in his shop allows Kilobyte to become independent, determined to rule the world. In the series finale, Ace and Lord Fear join forces and banish Kilobyte to the game world. However, Lord Fear turns on Ace and mortally wounds him, only to reveal that Lady Illusion took his place, and she dies in Ace's arms.

Characters

Main characters
 Michael Riley as Ace Lightning: The titular character, the playable character from the fictional game Ace Lightning and the Carnival of Doom. A superhero and Lightning Knight from the Sixth Dimension, Ace recruits Mark as his sidekick to defeat Lord Fear.
 Thomas Wansey as Mark Hollander: The main protagonist, a 13-year-old British boy who moves to Conestoga Hills with his parents at the beginning of the series. Drawn into the battle of good and evil between Ace Lightning and Lord Fear, Mark reluctantly becomes Ace’s sidekick to win the game.
 Marc Minardi as Chuck Mugel: Mark’s best friend, a bullied but intelligent boy who is a fan of the game. He becomes aware of the game characters in the second season, becoming Ace’s secondary sidekick, mistakenly named “Chuckdude” by Ace.
 Shadia Simmons as Samantha Thompson: The most popular girl in school, Mark’s next-door neighbour, and girlfriend in the first season. In the second season, Samantha attends boarding school, appearing as a special guest.
 Ashley Leggat as Kat Adams: A new addition in the second season, Kat is a brash and inquisitive new girl who becomes Mark’s girlfriend.
 Juan Chioran as Lord Fear: Ace’s arch nemesis and antagonist of the series. A 352-year-old lich, Lord Fear, seeks revenge on Ace for crippling him and then imprisoning him in the Sixth Dimension. He rules over the Carnival of Doom, collecting the pieces of the Amulet of Zoar to use to rule the world.
 Tamara Bernier Evans as Lady Illusion: A shapeshifting villain, Lady Illusion is introduced as Lord Fear’s partner in love and crime. She develops a turbulent romance with Ace, testing her loyalties throughout the series.
 Deborah Odell as Sparx: A young, impetuous and daring Lightning Knight.
 Cal Dodd as Random Virus: A cyborg Lightning Knight and Ace’s friend, Random suffers from two clashing programs, one good and one evil. He is often sought out by Ace and Lord Fear to join their causes; as such, he hides in Conestoga Hills’ junkyard.
 Ted Atherton as Kilobyte: The main antagonist of the second season. Known as the Cyber Stalker, Kilobyte was created by the Master Programmer to conquer the world on his behalf. He has the cold, calculating mind of a hunter, possessing unlimited powers.

Recurring cast
 Michael Lamport as Staff Head: The figurehead who perches on the end of Lord Fear’s staff.
 Adrian Truss as Dirty Rat: A winged rat clown who serves as Lord Fear’s cowardly spy.
 Howard Jerome as Anvil: A dim-witted rhinoceros who acts as the muscle for Lord Fear’s gang.
 Keith Knight as Pigface: A grotesque, childish warthog minion.
 Richard Binsley as Googler: A maniacal jester summoned by Lord Fear early on the series, who has a grudge against Ace for trapping him in another dimension.
 Matt Ficner as Zip and Snip: Googler’s animated sock puppets.
 Robert Tinkler as Rotgut: An undead cowboy introduced in the second season, Rotgut is an overemotional zombie whose limbs fall off and prefer to be called the “walking dead”.
 Philip Williams as Duff Kent: The owner of the Kent Bros. Carnival, which becomes the Carnival of Doom. He also drives an ice cream truck, which the villains use as a mode of transport.
 R.D. Reid as Horace Cheseborough: Mark’s apathetic science teacher in junior high, and homeroom teacher in high school. He repeatedly encounters the game characters, becoming convinced they are extra-terrestrials.
 Devon Anderson as Pete Burgess: Mark’s friend in London, who he communicates with via webcam at the start of each episode.
 Jordan Hughes as Wayne Fisgus: A school bully who targets Mark and Chuck, and Jessica’s cousin. He is often frightened by Lord Fear, who he refers to as the “bone man”.
 Megan Park as Jessica Fisgus: Chuck's girlfriend and Wayne's cousin.
 Brandon Carrera as Brett Ramirez: Samantha’s boyfriend in the first season, a popular skateboarder and soccer player.
 Petra Wildgoose as Heather Hoffs: Samantha’s gossipy best friend and Mark’s girlfriend during the second half of the first season.
 Ned Vukovic as Simon Hollander: Mark’s father, an accountant who enthusiastically embraces American culture.
 Susan Danford as Fiona Hollander: Mark’s mother, a fussy real estate agent.
 Kayla Perlmutter as Ashley Hollander: Mark’s younger cousin.
 Diane Douglass as Nettie Kutcher: A matronly dinner lady at Conestoga Hills Elementary School.
 David Huband as Coach: The coach of the elementary school’s soccer team, and secret Ace Lightning fan.
 Brett Heard as Rick Hummel: A computer repairman, who is in actuality, the secret designer of the video game. He is an antagonist in the second season, operating as the Master Programmer, using Kilobyte in his own plans for world domination.

Episodes

Season 1 (2002–2003) 
The season aired between September 2002 and March 2003. When broadcast in America, the episodes were shown out of order, which sometimes resulted in severe continuity errors.  For instance, "Tunnel of Love" was shown before "Once Upon a Hero." Random Virus would show up as an established character of the day before he would be established. The runtime of each episode was 24:59.

Season 2 (2004 (Canada) 2005 (UK)) 

The second series was broadcast in most countries in 2004, but it aired in the United Kingdom during the summer of 2005 for unknown reasons.  This season was not aired in the United States due to the poor reception of the first season.  The graphics were greatly improved, and several of the characters, including Staff Head and Pigface, were changed to look more like the animals they resembled.  Kilobyte, Rotgut, Kat Adams and Rick the Master Programmer made their debut in this season. Chuck also met the Lightning Knights, and Mark got his own weapon, allowing him to battle the villains.  There were only 13 episodes with one overall storyline. The runtime of each episode was also 24:59.

Production 
The show was developed by BBC and Alliance Atlantis, with Rick Siggelkow as executive producer and creator of the show, and Jim Corston as head writer. Originally, the program's plot was to feature a superhero from a comic book coming to life, but it was changed due to children playing videos games more than a pastime than reading comics. Mark was inspired by Spider-Man's alter ego, Peter Parker. The series was in pre-production for two years and took a year and a half to complete the first season.

Matt Ficner designed the computer-generated characters for the series and also provided the voices of Zip and Snip in the first season. The series was shot in Toronto in 2001 between 23 June and 22 November of that year.

Reception
According to the 2003–2004 annual review of BBC Worldwide's children's products, the series was a success and translated into different languages and forty countries, gaining high ratings in the United States on DIC Kids Network. The series received 1.2 million viewers on average during the first season's airing in the United Kingdom.

However, a social argument occurred in 2004 regarding the series' content in relation to the Children's Television Act. Children's television analyst Dale Kunkel, a communication professor at the University of Arizona, described the series and Stargate Infinity as "anti-social". The opinions were shared by the activist groups of the United Church of Christ and Center of Digital Democracy, viewing both programmes as violent. Former CEO of DIC Entertainment, Andy Heyward, defended Ace Lightning, taking the educational requirement very seriously for each episode. Heyward also had the support of Donald F. Roberts, who believed the descriptions given by the activists "mischaracterizes" the series they were attacking.

Video game adaptation 

A video game adaptation titled Ace Lightning was released on PlayStation 2, Microsoft Windows, and Game Boy Advance on 25 October 2002. The game was developed by Absolute Studios and Tiertex Design Studios, and published by BBC Worldwide's game division, Gamezlab. It was only released in Europe.

References

External links 
 
 
 
 

 
2002 British television series debuts
2004 British television series endings
2000s British children's television series
BBC children's television shows
British children's action television series
British television series with live action and animation
English-language television shows
2002 video games
Action video games
Europe-exclusive video games
Game Boy Advance games
PlayStation 2 games
Windows games
Superhero television series
Television series by Alliance Atlantis
Television series by BBC Studios
Television shows set in the United States
Television shows filmed in Toronto